Destot's sign is a clinical sign in which a superficial haematoma is seen above the inguinal ligament in the groin, over the scrotum or perineum, or in the upper thigh. It can occur in patients with pelvic fracture.

References 

Emergency medicine